Sain Qaleh Rural District is in the Central District of Abhar County, Zanjan province, Iran. At the National Census of 2006, its population was 12,005 in 2,901 households. There were 11,645 inhabitants in 3,440 households at the following census of 2011. At the most recent census of 2016, the population of the rural district was 10,833 in 3,372 households. The largest of its 17 villages was Amidabad, with 2,147 people.

References 

Abhar County

Rural Districts of Zanjan Province

Populated places in Zanjan Province

Populated places in Abhar County